Kody House (born 6 June 1990) is an Australian rugby league footballer who in 2021 signed to play with Valleys Diehards after previous seasons with Ipswich Brothers and  Souths Logan Magpies in the QRL Women's Premiership.

Playing career
In 2014, House began playing rugby league for the Gladstone Raiderettes.

In 2015, while playing for the Calliope Roosters, House made her debut for Queensland in a 4–all draw with New South Wales.

On 23 September 2017, she made her Test debut for Australia, scoring a try in a 42–4 win over Papua New Guinea.

In June 2018, House represented Queensland Country at the inaugural Women's National Championships. On 14 June 2018, House signed one of 40 historic WNRL Elite contracts across the competition (4 Teams) hers with the Brisbane Broncos for the inaugural season of the NRL Women's Premiership. Injury prevented House from debuting or making an impact on the 2018 NRL Women's season until Round 3, where she made her debut for the Broncos, scoring a try in a 32–10 win over the New Zealand Warriors.

In 2020, House joined Ipswich Brothers in the QRL Women's Premiership.
In 2021, House joined Valleys Diehards in the QRL Women's Premiership

References

External links
QRL profile

1990 births
Living people
Australian female rugby league players
Australia women's national rugby league team players
Rugby league centres
Brisbane Broncos (NRLW) players
Rugby league players from Gladstone, Queensland